Sanlin is a station on Line 11 of the Shanghai Metro. It opened on August 31, 2013.

The station is located on the intersection of Sanlin Road and Shangnan Road in Sanlin Town, Pudong, Shanghai.

The station has 4 platforms with 3 tracks. Trains usually stop on the two outer tracks of the station. The middle track is mainly used to terminate trains from Huaqiao during peak hours.

References

Railway stations in Shanghai
Line 11, Shanghai Metro
Shanghai Metro stations in Pudong
Railway stations in China opened in 2013